The 2005 European Championship of Ski Mountaineering was the sixth European Championship of ski mountaineering and was held in Andorra from March 1, 2005 to March 5, 2005. The competition was organized by the International Council for Ski Mountaineering Competitions (ISMC) of the Union Internationale des Associations d'Alpinisme (UIAA).

Results

Nation ranking and medals 
Compared to the 2003 European Championship a vertical race and a relay race event were held but were not added to the total ranking of the Federació Andorrana de Muntanyisme (FAM).

(all age groups)

Vertical race 
Event held in Canillo on March 1, 2005

List of the best 10 participants by gender:

Team 
Event held in the Gran Valira on March 2, 2005

List of the best 10 teams by gender:

Individual 
Event held on March 3, 2005

List of the best 10 participants by gender:

Combination ranking 
combination ranking including the results of the individual and team races

List of the best 10 participants by gender

Relay race 
Event held near Soldau-El Tarter on March 5, 2005

List of the best 10 teams by gender:

References 

2005
European Championship Of Ski Mountaineering, 2005
International sports competitions hosted by Andorra
European Championship Of Ski Mountaineering, 2005